Leonid Konstantinovich Solovyov (born 9 March 1917 in Serpukhov; died 22 November 2004) was a Soviet Russian football player.

Honours
 Soviet Top League champion: 1945, 1949.
 Soviet Cup finalist: 1945, 1949.

External links
 

1917 births
People from Serpukhov
2004 deaths
Soviet footballers
FC Dinamo Minsk players
FC Dynamo Moscow players
Soviet Top League players
Association football midfielders
Sportspeople from Moscow Oblast